The Weird Al Show is an American television show hosted by "Weird Al" Yankovic. Produced in association with Dick Clark Productions and taped at NBC Studios, it aired on Saturday mornings on the CBS TV network. The show ran for one season, from September to December 1997. The show was released on DVD on August 15, 2006.

The show is framed as a "show-within-a-show", with Yankovic, starring as himself, living in an underground home while working as a television show host. It uses a combination of live-action skits with numerous guests, animated shorts, and musical performances by Yankovic and other guest bands. CBS had greenlit the show from Yankovic, seeking content for its required Educational/Informative programming block and framed similarly to Pee-Wee's Playhouse. Because of this, Yankovic and his writers struggled with developing content appropriate for children's programming that met CBS's expectations while still within Yankovic's form of visual and adult humor.

Synopsis
Each episode starts with a narrator (Billy West) introducing today's lesson to the viewers. Then, Al is in a common situation in his cave dwelling that he addresses to the viewers. Afterward, he watches a TV displaying parody shows and commercials that are related to the day's show. Most of the time, Al's friend Bobby the Inquisitive Boy stops by and asks him a question. In turn, Al plays him an old-fashioned educational film to help answer his question. Sometimes, the show features an animated cartoon called "Fatman", which is about Weird Al as a fat superhero. At the end of the show, there is a commercial parody being shown followed by a band performing a song. Sometimes, Al reviews today's lesson before closing out the show.

Development
Around the time of recording "Eat It" in 1984, Yankovic and his manager started pitching the idea of a children's show hosted by Yankovic, believing that his energy suited this format well. It was not until the 1990s that the American network CBS showed interest, specifically looking for Saturday morning content that would meet new Federal Communications Commission (FCC) rules requiring broadcast networks to carry a number of hours of "Educational/Informative" (E/I) programming content. While this was not Yankovic's preferred approach, he considered it "the deal we made with the devil" as to get his show on air.

Director Peyton Reed was brought to the show through his wife, who worked in a music video production company that had done some of Yankovic's music videos, and was hired by CBS to produce the show. The show had been pitched to Reed as similar to Pee-wee's Playhouse, but to have a more subversive humor that followed Yankovic's style of comedy. CBS brought in Wayne White, the production designer for Pee-wee's Playhouse, to construct the set for "The Weird Al Show". For casting, Yankovic used a combination of previous actors he collaborated with (such as Judy Tenuta) and casting calls for others.

Filming was done in NBC Studios in Burbank, California, in the same sound stage used by The Tonight Show Starring Johnny Carson and down the hall from the recording of The Tonight Show with Jay Leno. As Yankovic had difficulty in getting guests, he had sometimes tried to ask Leno's guests to appear on his show while they were waiting backstage; he had approached and secured Drew Carey's appearance this way.

Writing for the show was challenged due to the E/I expectations demanded by CBS. CBS, through producer Dick Clark, frequently demanded changes to some of the visual humor written by Yankovic and the writing staff, fearing it was "imitable behavior" for children watching, and which limited how much visual comedy they could use. CBS also demanded a moral for each episode, and insisted that the moral had to be stated clearly at the start of each episode. To get around this, Yankovic brought in voice actor Billy West to scream out the moral at the very start of the episode, and then let the episode continue as they wanted. The writers knew some of their material would be scrapped by censors but wrote such scenes anyway, but were often surprised at what the censors left in. For example, a sketch in which Baby and Papa Boolie commit suicide after listening to one too many of Fred Huggins's songs was being seriously considered by the network for use on the show. The sketch was later rewritten to have Papa Boolie call a mental hospital to take Fred away. The unused script of the unedited Fred Huggins sequence is role-played in an audio commentary for an episode on the DVD.

CBS also wanted more of Yankovic's music parodies as part of the show, though they would not pay for the royalties for the original song. Yankovic ended up doing one original parody, "Lousy Haircut", loosely based on "Firestarter" by The Prodigy.  The network desired to see musical acts of younger musical groups that would appeal to their target audience at the time. One of these was Hanson, who had just reached fame with their single "MMMBop". From this, Yankovic and the band members developed a camaraderie that continued long after the show, with Yankovic helping to direct some of their later videos. The show also featured the first television broadcast of the Barenaked Ladies, though Yankovic was surprised that the network allowed them to use the band's full name at the time.

The show was cancelled after one season. Yankovic and the others on the team acknowledged that CBS did not find that the show followed the formulatic pattern set by Pee-wee's Playhouse, and coupled with difficulties in keeping the show in check, opted to cancel it. Yankovic and others on the production found in retrospect that working on the show was far too stressful and not the vision of what they wanted it to be; for the show's DVD commentary, much of the commentary ended up being directed at the issues they had with CBS in producing the show.

Undeveloped material 
The series contains many Star Wars references, and Yankovic planned a segment in which he claimed to have played Luke Skywalker's "annoying younger brother" in scenes cut from the original Star Wars film. According to Yankovic, he planned to show "actual scenes from Star Wars with me green-screened into them, seamlessly interacting with the characters. Of course, we had to get clearances from everybody before CBS would agree to let us shoot it. In the end, George Lucas signed off on it, and Sir Alec Guinness signed off on it, but Mark Hamill would not agree to let us use any footage with him in it -- so unfortunately, the whole bit had to be scrapped."

Music

Theme song
The theme song can be found on Yankovic's album Running with Scissors (1999) as "The Weird Al Show Theme".

It tells the story of how Al came to live in a tree and get a television show, including references to the fabricated life story in The Compleat Al, such as having worked in a nasal decongestant factory. Also referenced is playing on the company bowling team, which may be a reference to "Generic Blues".

The visuals for the show's theme are done in three different styles - traditional animation, 3D computer animation, and claymation. The claymation portion was done by Mark Osborne and Scott Nordlund, who had previously done Yankovic's "Jurassic Park" music video.

Bite Me
After the end credits of each case, when the "Ear Booker Productions" logo flashes on the screen repeatedly, a three-second version of the "Bite Me" track can be heard. "Bite Me" originally appeared as a six second long hidden track on the CD version of Weird Al" Yankovic's 1992 album Off the Deep End. The track appeared after 10 minutes of the final track ("You Don't Love Me Anymore"). The track was included as a parody of Nirvana's hidden track on the album Nevermind, but also to scare listeners into turning off the CD.

Cast

"Weird Al" Yankovic as himself, Fred Huggins, Tony Malone, Fatman, various other characters
Eddie Deezen as The Guy Boarded in the Wall
Donavan Freberg as Baby Boolie
Stan Freberg as Papa Boolie, J. B. Toppersmith
Gary LeRoi Gray as Bobby the Inquisitive Boy
Brian Haley as The Hooded Avenger
Harvey the Wonder Hamster as himself
Ed Marques as Varna the Squirmese Cook
Paula Jai Parker as Val Brentwood, Gal Spy
Patricia Place as Mrs. Fesenmeyer
Jack Plotnick as Uncle Ralphie
Judy Tenuta as Madame Judy the Psychic
Danielle Weeks as Cousin Corky
Billy West as the show's narrator/announcer, voice of Harvey the Wonder Hamster in "Fatman" shorts
Mary Yankovic as Mom (herself)
Nick Yankovic as Dad (himself)

Gedde Watanabe's character, Kuni, also appeared in Yankovic's film, UHF. David Bowe, Victoria Jackson, Kevin McCarthy, and Emo Philips who also were in the film made cameos on the show.

Episodes

Home media
Shout Factory, a company known for bringing cult series to DVD, released The Weird Al Show: The Complete Series on August 15, 2006. It is a 3-DVD set of all 13 episodes of The Weird Al Show, plus bonus features. The episodes are presented in broadcast order.

The Weird Al Show was released on DVD in Canada on September 26, 2006, alongside the U.S. release of his new album, Straight Outta Lynwood.

Before the DVD set release, a compilation of the short music video segments for "Lousy Haircut", "Lasagna", and "Livin' in the Fridge" (as well as the show opening) was released on "Weird Al" Yankovic: The Ultimate Video Collection in 2003.

Special features
 13 commentaries with "Weird Al" as well as other cast and crew members.
 "The Evolution of 'Fatman'", a featurette consisting of original concept art—the "Fatman" cartoons were based on Weird Al's hit song, "Fat".
 Concept art gallery.
 Animated storyboards.
 Karaoke for the show's Theme Song.

See also

References

External links 
 
 The Weird Al Show at Jump The Shark

1990s American children's comedy television series
1990s American sketch comedy television series
1997 American television series debuts
1997 American television series endings
American children's education television series
American television shows featuring puppetry
CBS original programming
Children's sketch comedy
English-language television shows
Personal development television series
Television series about television
Television series based on singers and musicians
Television series by Dick Clark Productions
Television shows directed by Peyton Reed
"Weird Al" Yankovic